is a city located in Saitama Prefecture, Japan. , the city had an estimated population of 75,218 in 33,119 households and a population density of 3000 persons per km2.

Geography
Okegawa is located in east-central Saitama Prefecture, most of the city area is on the Omiya plateau. The highest point is 25 meters above sea level in the northwest. The Arakawa River flows through the city. The Motoara River flows on the east side of the city, on the border with Kuki.

Surrounding municipalities
Saitama Prefecture
 Ageo
 Kitamoto
 Kōnosu
 Hasuda
 Kuki
 Ina
 Kawajima

Climate
Okegawa has a humid subtropical climate (Köppen Cfa) characterized by warm summers and cool winters with light to no snowfall.  The average annual temperature in Okegawa is 14.7 °C. The average annual rainfall is 1367 mm with September as the wettest month. The temperatures are highest on average in August, at around 26.7 °C, and lowest in January, at around 3.7 °C.

Demographics
Per Japanese census data, the population of Okegawa has recently plateaued after a long period of growth.

History
During the Edo period, Okegawa-shuku was the sixth of the sixty-nine stations of the Nakasendō, with the surrounding area noted for its production of safflower.

The town of Okegawa was established within Iruma District with the establishment of the modern municipalities system on April 1, 1889. On January 1, 1955, Okegawa annexed the neighboring village of Kano, followed by the village of Kawataya on March 10, 1955. Okegawa was elevated to city status on November 3, 1970.

Government
Okegawa has a mayor-council form of government with a directly elected mayor and a unicameral city council of 19 members. Okegawa contributes one member to the Saitama Prefectural Assembly. In terms of national politics, the city is part of Saitama 6th district of the lower house of the Diet of Japan.

Economy
Okegawa was traditionally known as a center for safflower production.  The city now has a mixed economy, with a significant portion of its population commuting to Tokyo or Saitama city for work.

Education
 Okegawa has seven public elementary schools and four public middle schools operated by the city government, and two public high schools operated by the Saitama Prefectural Board of Education.

Transportation

Railway
 JR East – Takasaki Line

Highway
  – Okegawa-Kita Interchange, Okegawa-Kano Interchange

Local attractions
Okegawa-shuku
Honda Airport
Kawataya Kofun cluster
Okegawa Gion Festival

Noted people from Okegawa
Masahiro Motoki, actor
Michiyo Tsujimura, agricultural chemist

References

External links

Official Website 

Cities in Saitama Prefecture
Okegawa, Saitama